Highway 60 is a major road in the Kingdom of Saudi Arabia. It connects the cities of Al-Qassim Region, Medina, Yanbu, Rabigh and Thuwal. The construction was completed in 2005 at a total cost of approximately 3.30 million Riyals. Highway 60 is important for tourism and pilgrimage.

See also
 Transport in Saudi Arabia

References

Roads in Saudi Arabia
Road infrastructure in Saudi Arabia
Road transport in Saudi Arabia